Herrerita is the name of:

Herrerita (footballer, born 1914), Spanish footballer
Herrerita (footballer, born 1939), Spanish footballer